Tailwind is a wind that blows in the direction of travel of an object.

Tailwind may also refer to:
 Tailwind CSS, a frontend CSS framework.
 Wittman Tailwind, a light aircraft
 Operation Tailwind, a military/media controversy
 Tailwind Sports, see Discovery Channel Pro Cycling Team, a professional cycling team
 Tailwind (Transformers), a Transformers character
 Tailwind Airlines, an airline
 Tailwind (album), album by Harmony James